Lennie Lake (born 25 May 1967) is a Kittitian cricketer. He played in two first-class and seven List A matches for the Leeward Islands from 1992 to 1995.

See also
 List of Leeward Islands first-class cricketers

References

External links
 

1967 births
Living people
Kittitian cricketers
Leeward Islands cricketers